Robert McGowan may refer to:

 Robert F. McGowan (1882–1955), American film director and producer
 Robert A. McGowan (1901–1955), American screenwriter and film director